Basedow may refer to:

Places
Basedow, Mecklenburg-Vorpommern, in the district of Demmin, Mecklenburg-Vorpommern, Germany
 Basedow, Schleswig-Holstein, in the district of Lauenburg, Schleswig-Holstein, Germany

People
 Johann Bernhard Basedow (1724-1790), German educational reformer
 John Basedow, American television personality and motivational speaker
 Karl Adolph von Basedow (1799-1854), German doctor who described the Graves-Basedow disease
 Martin Basedow (1829–1902), Australian teacher, newspaper proprietor and politician
 Herbert Basedow (1881–1933), Australian anthropologist, geologist, explorer and medical practitioner
 Rainer Basedow (1938-2022), German film, television, and voice actor

Other
 Graves' disease, in continental Europe called Graves-Basedow or just Basedow disease and informally shortened just to "Basedow"